Pissing On Bonfires / Kissing With Tongues is the debut studio album by Scottish indie folk band Meursault, released in 2008 to a generally positive reception from the music press and online community critics. The band initially self-released the album in 2008, before a second run was released on the Edinburgh-based independent label, Song, by Toad Records, in 2009.

Track listing

Personnel

Meursault
Chris Bryant
Fraser Calder
Calum MacLeod
Neil Pennycook

Cultural references

 Scott Hutchison of Frightened Rabbit has often performed A Small Stretch Of Land; taken from Pissing On Bonfires / Kissing With Tongues and written by Neil Pennycook, during his live appearances. He also said that inspired Poke and that it was a "perfect" song to him that he'd wish he'd written.
 The BBC selected The Furnace for heavy daytime rotation on Radio 1 as part of their promotion of the corporation's coverage of Glastonbury 2010.
 Scottish arts and culture magazine The Skinny placed Pissing On Bonfires / Kissing With Tongues sixteenth in its list of the best Scottish albums of the 2000-2010 decade.

References

External links
 Meursault on MySpace
 Song, by Toad Records

2008 albums
Folktronica albums
Meursault (band) albums